Gabriel Gavril Kicsid (born 2 April 1948 in Imeni, Covasna County) is a former Romanian handball player who competed in the 1972 Summer Olympics and in the 1976 Summer Olympics.

In 1972 he won the bronze medal with the Romanian team. He played all six matches and scored twelve goals.

Four years later he won the silver medal as part of the Romanian team. He played four matches including the final and scored four goals.

References 
 

1948 births
Living people
Romanian male handball players
CSA Steaua București (handball) players
Olympic handball players of Romania
Olympic silver medalists for Romania
Olympic bronze medalists for Romania
Olympic medalists in handball
Medalists at the 1972 Summer Olympics
Medalists at the 1976 Summer Olympics
Handball players at the 1972 Summer Olympics
Handball players at the 1976 Summer Olympics
People from Covasna County